Jan Hassink (6 April 1902 – 26 July 1927) was a Dutch footballer. He played in two matches for the Netherlands national football team in 1926.

Hassink was the first PSV-player ever who was selected for the national football team.

Personal life
Jan was born in Meppel, the son of Jannes Hassink and Fredrika Andria Bordewijk.

He died in 1927 from injuries sustained in a motorcycle accident.

Career statistics

Sources

References

External links
 

1902 births
1927 deaths
Dutch footballers
People from Meppel
Association football defenders
AFC Ajax players
PSV Eindhoven players
Netherlands international footballers
Motorcycle road incident deaths
Road incident deaths in the Netherlands
Footballers from Drenthe